This article is a list of diseases of date palms (Phoenix dactylifera).

Fungal diseases

Nematodes, parasitic

Insect pests

Bacteria

References

External links 
Common Names of Diseases, The American Phytopathological Society

Date palm
Palm diseases
Disease
Date